Downhill may refer to:

Arts and entertainment
 Downhill (1927 film), a British film by Alfred Hitchcock
 Downhill (2014 film), a British comedy directed by James Rouse
 Downhill (2016 film), a Chilean thriller directed by Patricio Valladares
 Downhill (2020 film), an American comedy drama film directed by Nat Faxon and Jim Rash
 "Downhill" (Kim Possible), an episode in the Disney TV series Kim Possible
 The Downhill, a 1961 Greek drama film

Places
 Downhill (beach), a beach in County Londonderry, Northern Ireland
 Downhill, Cornwall, a hamlet in the parish of St Eval, Cornwall, England
 Downhill, County Londonderry, a village and townland in Northern Ireland
 Downhill, Sunderland, a suburb of the City of Sunderland, Tyne and Wear, England
 Downhill, an area of Lincoln, England

Sport
 Downhill skiing, the sport of sliding down snow-covered hills on skis with fixed-heel bindings
 Downhill (ski competition), a specific kind of Alpine skiing
 Downhill mountain biking, a genre of mountain biking practiced on steep, rough terrain

See also
 
 Down (disambiguation)
 Downhill racing (disambiguation)
 Hill (disambiguation)
 Uphill (disambiguation)